is one of the main roads leading westwards out of Tokyo.  It begins in Shinjuku, passes through Ōme, and ends in Kōfu, Yamanashi.

The road was originally developed in 1606 to transport lime from Ome during the land reclamation efforts in Edo during the Tokugawa era and was known by different names in different eras and regions over the course of time, as "Ogawa-michi" and "Hakonegasaki-michi" in Edo, "Afume-michi" or "Mitake-michi" in Ome, and "Haraedo-michi" in Hakonegasaki. It was identified as 'Ōme Kaidō' on a survey map created in 1880 and formally designated as such in 1962.

Ōme Kaidō overbridge

The Chuō, Saikyō, Shōnan-Shinjuku, and Yamanote train lines pass over the highway, with 10 lanes of roadway and sidewalks beneath.

It is frequently featured in popular culture as the unofficial western gate to Kabukichō, most recently featured in the opening titles of Midnight Diner on Netflix.

Stations of the Ōme Kaidō
There are 9 post stations along the Ōme Kaidō. They are listed below with the corresponding modern-day municipality listed in parentheses.

 Nakano-juku（Nakano, Tokyo）
 Tanashi-juku（Nishitōkyō, Tokyo）
 Ogawa-juku（Kodaira, Tokyo）
 Hakonegasaki-juku（Mizuho, Nishitama District, Tokyo）
 Ōme-juku（Ōme, Tokyo）
 Hikawa-shuku（Okutama, Nishitama District, Tokyo）
 Taba-shuku（Tabayama, Kitatsuru District, Yamanashi）
 Enzan-juku（Kōshū, Yamanashi)
 Kobara-juku（Yamanashi, Yamanashi)

See also
Itsukaichi Kaidō
Edo Five Routes
Tōkaidō (or 53 Stations of the Tōkaidō)
Nakasendō (or 69 Stations of the Nakasendō)
Ōshū Kaidō
Nikkō Kaidō

References

External links
Ōme Kaidō Cycling
Walking the Ōme Kaidō
Ōme Kaidō Log

Roads in Tokyo
Roads in Yamanashi Prefecture
Edo period